Daniel Brodhead Heiner (December 30, 1854 – February 14, 1944) was an American lawyer and politician who served as a two-term Republican member of the U.S. House of Representatives from Pennsylvania from 1893 to 1897.

Biography
Daniel Brodhead Heiner, Jr. was born in Kittanning, Pennsylvania, the son of Daniel Brodhead Heiner, Sr. and Mary. G. Graham of Kittanning, Pennsylvania. He attended the public schools at Kittanning, Dayton Academy in Dayton, Pennsylvania, and Dickinson School of Law at Carlisle, Pennsylvania.  He graduated from Allegheny College in Meadville, Pennsylvania, in 1879.

He was admitted to the bar of Armstrong County, Pennsylvania, in 1882 and commenced practice in Kittanning. He was also engaged in banking.  He was elected district attorney of Armstrong County in 1885, reelected in 1888, and served until January 1, 1892. He was chairman of the Republican county executive committee from 1884 to 1888.

Family life
Heiner was a direct descendant of Revolutionary War veteran Brigadier General Daniel Brodhead, through his great-grandmother, Ann Garton Brodhead, who was Brodhead's elder daughter.

Congressman
Heiner was elected as a Republican to the Fifty-third and Fifty-fourth Congresses. He was not a candidate for renomination in 1896.

Later career 
He was appointed by President William McKinley as United States district attorney for the Western District of Pennsylvania and served from 1897 to 1902.

He was appointed on February 2, 1902, as internal-revenue collector for the twenty-third district of Pennsylvania by President Theodore Roosevelt and served until November 1, 1913. He was a delegate to the 1920 Republican National Convention.  He again served as internal-revenue collector from 1921 to 1933.

Death
He died in Kittanning in 1944, and was interred in the Kittanning Cemetery.

References

Sources

The Political Graveyard

1854 births
1944 deaths
People from Kittanning, Pennsylvania
United States Attorneys for the Western District of Pennsylvania
Allegheny College alumni
Republican Party members of the United States House of Representatives from Pennsylvania
Dickinson School of Law alumni